Xplosiv is the thirteenth studio album by La Mafia. It was released on February 11, 1989. The album entered the Billboard Latin Regional chart at number 16 and reached a peak position of number 4 by March 1989.

Track listing

References

1989 albums
La Mafia albums
Spanish-language albums